The New York Yankees were a professional American football team that played in the All-America Football Conference (AAFC) from 1946 to 1949. The team played in Yankee Stadium in the Bronx. They were owned by Dan Topping, who transferred the team from the NFL Brooklyn Dodgers, retaining many of the same players. The team's coach was Ray Flaherty, who had coached the Washington Redskins in the early 1940s. Former NFL player Jim Barber served as an assistant coach under Flaherty.

The Yankees appeared in the 1946 AAFC championship game, but lost to the Cleveland Browns by a score of 14–9. The same two teams appeared in the championship game the following year, with the Browns winning again 14–3.

Before the 1949 season, the Brooklyn Dodgers football team folded and merged into the Yankees, which became the Brooklyn-New York Yankees, but this was the final season of the AAFC, which was then absorbed by the NFL. The Yankees players were divided between the New York Giants and New York Bulldogs, who played as the New York Yanks starting in 1950.

Players of note
 Brad Ecklund
 Nate Johnson
 Jack Russell
 Spec Sanders
 Otto Schnellbacher
 Frank Sinkwich
 Bob Sweiger
Jordan Jenkins
 George Brown

Pro Football Hall of Famers

Season records

|-
| colspan="6" align="center" style="color:white; background-color:#041E42;"| New York Yankees
|-
| 1946 || 10 || 3 || 1 || 1st AAFC East || Lost to Cleveland, 14–9, in AAFC Championship Game
|-
| 1947 || 11 || 2 || 1 || 1st AAFC East || Lost to Cleveland, 14–3, in AAFC Championship Game
|-
| 1948 || 6 || 8 || 0  || 3rd AAFC East || align="center"|Did Not Qualify
|-
| colspan="6" align="center" style="color:white; background-color:#041E42;"| Brooklyn-New York Yankees
|-
| 1949 || 8 || 4 || 0 || 3rd AAFC || Lost to San Francisco, 17–7, in AAFC Semifinal Playoffs
|-
!Totals || 35 || 17 || 2
|colspan="2"|

References

 
Defunct American football teams in New York City
Sports in the Bronx